Archibald Ian Allan (3 January 1916 – 13 February 2000) was an Australian politician. Born in Newcastle, New South Wales, he attended Sydney Grammar School before becoming an overseer at CSR. After serving in World War II from 1939 to 1946, he became an ABC announcer in Tamworth. In the by-election for the Australian House of Representatives seat of Gwydir that followed the death of Thomas Treloar in 1953, Allan was selected as the Country Party candidate and won. He held the seat until his resignation in 1969, after which he became Secretary-General of the Commonwealth War Graves Commission. Allan died in 2000.

References

National Party of Australia members of the Parliament of Australia
Members of the Australian House of Representatives for Gwydir
Members of the Australian House of Representatives
1916 births
2000 deaths
20th-century Australian politicians
Australian Army personnel of World War II
Australian Army officers